Eremosybra is a genus of beetles in the family Cerambycidae, containing the following species:

 Eremosybra albosignata Breuning, 1960
 Eremosybra flavolineata Breuning, 1942
 Eremosybra flavolineatoides Breuning, 1964

References

Apomecynini
Cerambycidae genera